The 2016–17 San Francisco Dons men's basketball team represented the University of San Francisco during the 2016–17 NCAA Division I men's basketball season. It was head coach Kyle Smith's first season at San Francisco. The Dons played their home games at the War Memorial Gymnasium as members of the West Coast Conference. They finished the season 20–13, 10–8 in WCC play to finish in a tie for fourth place. They lost in the quarterfinals of the WCC tournament to Santa Clara. They were invited to the College Basketball Invitational where they lost in the first round to Rice.

Previous season 
The Dons finished the 2015–16 season 15–15, 8–10 in WCC play to finish in fifth place. They lost in the quarterfinals of the WCC tournament to Pepperdine.

On March 9, 2016, head coach Rex Walters was fired. On March 30, the school hired Kyle Smith as head coach.

Departures

Recruiting Class of 2016

Roster

Schedule and results

|-
!colspan=12 style=| Non-conference regular season

|-
!colspan=12 style=| WCC regular season

|-
!colspan=12 style=| WCC tournament

|-
!colspan=12 style=| CBI

References

San Francisco Dons men's basketball seasons
San Francisco
San Francisco
San Francisco Dons

San Francisco Dons
San Francisco Dons
2017 in San Francisco